Abahani Limited is a cricket team that plays List A and T20 cricket in the Dhaka Premier League and  Dhaka Premier Division Twenty20 Cricket League.  It has won three titles in 2015–16, 2017–18 and 2018–19.

This is presenting a complete list in alphabetical order of cricketers who have played for Abahani Limited in first-class, List A or Twenty20 matches since the team was formed ahead of the 1992-93 for the first edition of Navana Premier Division Cricket League competition. Complying with other club lists, details are the player's name followed by his years active as a Abahani Limited/Abahani Krira Chakra player, current players to the end of the 2015–16 season.

A 

 Abdul Mazid (2014–15)
 Abdul Razzaq (Pakistan; 2009–10)
 Abul Hasan (2010–11 to 2015–16)
 Aftab Ahmed (2013–14)
 Ahsanullah Hasan (2000–01 to 2005–06)
 Akram Khan (1993–94 to 2001–02)
 Alamgir Kabir (2001–02)
 Al-Amin (2013–14 to 2014–15)
 Al-Amin Hossain (2013–14 to 2014–15)
 Alauddin Babu (2010–11 to 2013–14)
 Ali Arman (2000–01 to 2005–06)
 Amit Kumar (2015–16)
 Anamul Haque (2010–11 to 2015–16)
 Anisur Rahman (2000–01)
 Anwaar Hafeez (2007–08)
 Anwar Hossain Monir (2001–02 to 2005–06)
 Arafat Sunny (2007–08 to 2015–16)
 Asadullah Khan (2000–01 to 2001–02)
 Ashfaq Ali (1994–95)
 Ashiqul Islam (2008–09)
 Ashraful Islam (1994–95)
 Aslam Ali (2013–14)
 Avishek Mitra (2015–16)
 Azam Iqbal (2000–01)

B 

 Babu (1993–94)
 Rajat Bhatia (India; 2010–11 to 2015–16)
 Biplab Sarkar (2008–09)
 Manvinder Bisla (India; 2015–16)

D 

 Rashmi Ranjan Das (India; 2011–12)
 Debabrata Paul (2005–06)
 Zander de Bruyn (South Africa; 2013–14)
 Indika de Saram (Sri Lanka; 2013–14)
 Shikhar Dhawan (India; 2010–11)

E 

 Elias Sunny (2011–12)
 Enamul Haque (2010–11)

F 

 Neil Fairbrother (England; 1993–94)
 Faisal Hossain (2005–06)
 Farhad Hossain (2010–11 to 2014–15)
 Farhad Reza (2011–12 to 2013–14)
 Faruque (1993–94)
 Fawad Alam (Pakistan; 2010–11)
 Fazle Mahmud (2011–12)

G 

 Gazi Alamgir (2005–06 to 2007–08)
 Gazi Ashraf (1993–94 to 1994–95)
 Janaka Gunaratne (Sri Lanka; 2013–14)

H 

 Hamidul Islam (2009–10 to 2013–14)
 Hannan Sarkar (2010–11)
 Harunur Rashid (1994–95)
 Hasanuzzaman (2005–06)

I 

 Iftekhar Nayeem (2013–14)
 Richard Illingworth (England; 1993–94)
 Imran Abbas (Pakistan; 2006–07)
 Imran Ahmed (2005–06 to 2008–09)
 Imrul Kayes (2009–10 to 2010–11)
 Iqbal Hossain (2000–01 to 2001–02)
Iqbal Sikandar (Pakistan; 1994–95)
Istiak Jamil (2006–07)

J 

 Jahidul Islam (2011–12 to 2013–14)
 Jahurul Islam (2005–06 to 2015–16)
 Jewel Hossain (1994–95)
 Jubair Hossain (2014–15 to 2016)
 Jupiter Ghosh (2009–10)

K 

 Kamal Merchant (Pakistan; 1994–95)
 Kamrul Islam Imon (2007–08 to 2008–09)
 Kamrul Islam Rabbi
 Thilina Kandamby (Sri Lanka; 2007–08 to 2013–14)
 Dinesh Karthik (India; 2015–16)
 Uday Kaul (India; 2015–16)
 Khaled Mashud (1994–95 to 2006–07)
 Ajay Kudua (India; 2009–10)
 Khuntal Chandra (2006–07)

L 

 Raman Lamba (1994–95)
 Liton (1993–94)
 Liton Das (2013–14 to 2015–16)

M 

 Mahbubul Alam (2010–11)
 Mahbubul Karim (2007–08 to 2009–10)
 Mahmudullah (2010–11 to 2015–16)
 Manash Kumar (2008–09)
 Mithun Manhas (India; 2010–11 to 2011–12)
 Manurul Islam Rana (2006–07)
 Manzoor Akhtar (Pakistan; 1994–95)
 Marshal Ayyub (2010–11 to 2011–12)
 Hamilton Masakdaza (Zimbabwe; 2014–15)
 Mashrafe Mortaza (2006–07 to 2015–16)
 Masudur Rahman (2000–01)
 Mehedi Maruf (2013–14)
 Mehrab Hossain (2001–02)
 Minhajul Abedin (1993–94 to 1994–95)
 Mohammad Mithun (2015–16)
Mizanur Rahman (2013–14)
Mohammad Hossain (2000–01 to 2001–02)
Mohammad Rafique (2007–08 to 2010–11)
Mohammad Saifuddin (2015–16)
Mohammad Salim (2000–01)
Mohammad Shahzada (2006–07 to 2015–16)
OH Monir (1994–95)
Moniruzzaman (2001–02)
Morshed Ali Khan (2000–01)
Mosaddek Hossain (2013–14 to 2015–16)
Muktar Ali (2009–10)
Mukhtar Siddique (2001–02)
Mushfiqur Rahim (2013–14 to 2015–16)
Mustafizur Rahman (2014–15 to 2015–16)
Amol Mazumdar (2008–09)Naeem Islam Jr.

N 

 Nabil Samad (2013–14)
 Nadif Chowdhury (2007–08 to 2009–10)
 Naeem Islam Jr. (2013–14)
 Naeem Islam (2006–07)
 Nafees Iqbal (2000–01 to 2013–14)
 Naimur Rahman (1994–95 to 2001–02)
 Narendar Singh (India; 2011–12)
 Nasir Ahmed (1993–94)
 Nasir Hossain (2008–09 to 2015–16)
 Naved Anjum (Pakistan; 1994–95)
 Nazimuddin (2006–07 to 2013–14)
 Nazmul Hossain Shanto (2015–16)
 Mohammad Nazmul Hossain (2007–08 to 2008–09)
 Nazmul Hossain Milon (2013–14)
 Nazmul Islam (2011–12 to 2015–16)
 Nazmus Sadat (2006–07)
 Niamur Rashid (2000–01 to 2005–06)

P 

 Tharanga Pranavitana (Sri Lanka; 2013–14)
 Rashmi Parida (India; 2008–09 to 2010–11)
 Yusuf Pathan (India; 2015–16)
 Punit Singh (India; 2011–12)

R 

 Rafikul Khan (2007–08)
 Bhanuka Rajapaksha (Sri Lanka; 2014–15)
 Rajibul Islam (2001–02)
 Rakib Hasan (1994–95)
 Raqibul Hasan (2014–15)
 Rezaul Islam (2013–R14)
 Rejaul Karim (2007–08 to 2008–09)
 Rafiqul Hasan Ripon (1993–94)
 Robiul Islam (2009–10)
Rony Talukdar (2008–09 to 2010–11)

S 

 Saghir Hossain (2007–08 to 2010–11)
 Saidul Islam (1993–94)
 Saif Hassan (2015–16)
 Saiful Islam (1993–94 to 1994–95)
 Sunzamul Islam (2015–16)
 Saqlain Sajib (2010–11to 2015–16)
 Sachithra Serasinghe (Sri Lanka; 2013–14)
 Shadab Kabir (Pakistan; 2005–06)
 Shadman Islam (2015–16)
 Shahadat Hossain (2015–16)
 Shahriar Nafees (2007–08 to 2013–14)
 Shakib Al Hasan (2009–10 to 2015–16)
 Shamimul Haque (2005–06)
 Shamsul Alam (2013–14)
 Shamsur Rahman (2013–14)
 Sheikh Sadi (1994–95)
 Shoaib Malik (Pakistan; 2000–01)
 Shuvagata Hom (2015–16)
 Chamara Silva (Sri Lanka; 2014–15)
 Gurupartap Singh (India; 1994–95)
 Robin Singh (India; 2000–01)
 Greg Smith (South Africa; 2013–14)
 Soumya Sarkar (2013–14 to 2015–16)
 Darren Stevens (England; 2011–12)
 Heath Streak (Zimbabwe; 2001–02)
 Subashis Roy (2007–08 to 2014–15)
 Subroto Sarkar (2011–12)
 Suhrawadi Shuvo (2006–07 to 2013–14)
 Sujon (1993–94)

T 

 Talha Jubair (2007–08 to 2008–09)
 Tamim Iqbal (2008–09 to 2015–16)
 Tapash Baisya (2010–11 to 2015–16)
 Taposh Ghosh (2013–14 to 2015–16)
 Tareq Javed (2000–01)
 Taskin Ahmed (2015–16)
 Manoj Tiwary (India; 2015–16)
 Tawhidul Islam (2015–16)
 Peter Trego (England; 2011–12)
 Tushar Imran (2006–07 to 2007–08)
 Twilna Sahan (2007–08)

U 

 Mahela Udawatte (Sri Lanka; 2011–12)

V 

 Venugopal Rao (India; 2008–09)

W 

 Wasim Akram (Pakistan; 1994–95)
 Riki Wessels (Australia; 2013–14)
 Luke Wright (England; 2013–14)

Y 

 Yashpal Singh (India; 2010–11 to 2015–16)
 Yasir Ali (2013–14)

Z 

 Zakir Hossain (1994–95)
 Ziaur Rahman (2006–07 to 2014–15)

References

External links 
 Abahani Limited at CricketArchive

Lists of Bangladeshi cricketers
Abahani Limited cricketers